Historic Environment Scotland (HES) is an executive non-departmental public body responsible for investigating, caring for and promoting Scotland's historic environment. HES was formed in 2015 from the merger of government agency Historic Scotland with the Royal Commission on the Ancient and Historical Monuments of Scotland (RCAHMS). Among other duties, Historic Environment Scotland maintains more than 300 properties of national importance including Edinburgh Castle, Skara Brae and Fort George.

History
The responsibilities of HES were formerly split between Historic Scotland, a government agency responsible for properties of national importance, and the Royal Commission on the Ancient and Historical Monuments of Scotland (RCAHMS), which collected and managed records about Scotland's historic environment.  Under the terms of a Bill of the Scottish Parliament published on 3 March 2014, the pair were dissolved and their functions transferred to Historic Environment Scotland, on 1 October 2015.

Historic Environment Scotland is a non-departmental public body with charitable status, governed by a board of trustees appointed by the Scottish Ministers. The body is charged with implementing "Our Place in Time", Scotland's historic environment strategy, and has responsibility for buildings and monuments in state care, as well as national collections of manuscripts, drawings and photographs. Beyond these collections, Historic Environment Scotland provides funding and guidance for conservation works and education across Scotland.

Canmore is an online database maintained by Historic Environment Scotland since 2015. Previously it was maintained by the Royal Commission on the Ancient and Historical Monuments of Scotland. The National Collection of Aerial Photography is also now a sub-brand of HES.

See also
 List of Historic Environment Scotland properties
 Listed buildings in Scotland
 Scheduled monument
 Scottish Ten
 Scottish Natural Heritage
 National Trust for Scotland
 Who Built Scotland: A History of the Nation in Twenty-Five Buildings
 Organisations which play a similar role to HES in the other countries of the United Kingdom:
 Cadw and the Royal Commission on the Ancient and Historical Monuments of Wales
 Historic England and English Heritage
 The Historic Environment Division of the Department for Communities in Northern Ireland (previously part of the Northern Ireland Environment Agency)

References

External links

 
2015 establishments in Scotland
Architecture in Scotland
 
Executive non-departmental public bodies of the Scottish Government
Archives in Scotland
Organisations based in Edinburgh
National Collections of Scotland
Government agencies established in 2015
Scotland, Historic Environment
Research organisations in Scotland